Euxoa difformis is a cutworm or dart moth in the family Noctuidae. The species was first described by Smith in 1900. It is found in North America.

The MONA or Hodges number for Euxoa difformis is 10845.

References

Further reading

 
 
 

Euxoa
Articles created by Qbugbot
Moths described in 1900